This is a list of historic counties of England by area as at the 1831 census. Note that Monmouthshire was considered to be part of England at the time.

References

1831 United Kingdom census
Area in 1831
1831 in England